Jean Wettstein (born 13 March 1933) is a French former footballer who played as a goalkeeper. He competed in the men's tournament at the 1960 Summer Olympics.

References

External links
 

1933 births
Living people
French footballers
Footballers from Mulhouse
Association football goalkeepers
Olympic footballers of France
Footballers at the 1960 Summer Olympics
FC Mulhouse players